A cigar case is a carrier for carrying cigars. The key aspect of a cigar case is its portability, and ease of carrying cigars in jacket pockets, etc. Over the years cigar cases have evolved from a simple wooden carrier to a luxurious tote, fully cedar lined to retain the humidity of cigars.

The leather cigar case has evolved over the past 20 years, from a soft leather pouch to a hard-leather safe. Some provided a slot for a cutter.

Types of cigar cases 
Based on construction and accessibility cigar cases are often categorised as follows:

Spanish cedar lined cases

As the name suggests, these have an lining made of Spanish cedar. These are usually stronger cases, and can withstand impact without damaging the cigars. These cases have two parts; top and bottom. Depending upon construction, one part slides onto the other. The degree of sliding can be adjusted to fit the length of the cigar.

Telescopic cigar cases

These cases have grooves to fit the cigars. These are usually sliding cases, as the top can be adjusted to the bottom in a telescoping fashion.  Usually, these cases do not have a cedar lining and are of relatively soft construction. The shell of the case is usually leather, which is creased against a die matching the ring gauge of the cigar to create the shape of the case. The forms include steel and silver.

Notable cigar case brands

Alfred Dunhill
Andre Garcia
Atoll Cigar Case
Craftsman Bench
Davidoff
Diamond Crown
Noro Cigar Case
Porsche Designs
Prometheus
Savinelli
Savoy
St. Dupont
Xikar

See also
Cigarette case

References

External links

 Cigar Case article published in 1993
 Cigar Case article published in Cigar Cyclopedia

Cigars
Containers
Tobacciana